Georgi Tutev (23 August 1924 – 13 September 1994) was a Bulgarian composer of contemporary classical music, one of the main representative of  Bulgarian modernism.

Life
He was the son of a Bulgarian father and German mother. He studied law at the "Climent Ohridski" Sofia University and music with Lubomir Pipkov, as well as composition in the Moscow State Conservatory with Yuri Shaporin and Viktor Bely.

Tutev is the founder and the first president of the SCMB - ISCM Bulgarian Section as well as the founder and organizer of the Musica Nova - Sofia, International Festival of Contemporary Music.

Works
Tale of the Lopian Forest (1951) 
Symphony No. 1 for orchestra (1959) 
Overtura da Requiem for orchestra (1963) 
Metamorphoses for 13 Strings (1966) 
Tempi Rithmizati for strings, piano and percussion (1968) 
Musica Concertante for strings, flute, cembalo and percussion (1968) 
Symphony No. 2 (Variationen) (1969–72) 
"Soli per tre" for wind trio (1974) 
Musica peritos in la Glorificat auf Themen unbekannter Meister der Renaissance (1975) 
Sehnsucht nach der vorlengegangenen Harmonie - Concertante Musik for large String orch, kaval, keyboards and percussion (1979–82)
Calvinomusica for cello and chamber ensemble (1987) 
J.S.B. Mediationen for chamber ensemble (1992)

External links
Classical Composers database
Union of Bulgarian Composers Database

1924 births
1994 deaths
Bulgarian classical composers
20th-century classical composers
Bulgarian people of German descent
Male classical composers
20th-century male musicians